Ken Mair is a New Zealand political activist and politician.  

He has unsuccessfully contested several general elections for Mana Māori.

Mair has acted as a spokesperson for Māori iwi in the area around the Whanganui River, and was one of the organisers of the 1995 occupation of Moutoa Gardens in Whanganui, in protest at grievances under the Treaty of Waitangi.

Mair is a descendant of Captain Gilbert Mair, who was awarded the New Zealand Cross (1869) during Te Kooti's War.

References

External links

Photograph of Mair at Moutoa Gardens protest

Living people
Year of birth missing (living people)
Māori Party politicians
21st-century New Zealand politicians
Mana Māori Movement politicians
People from Whangārei
Unsuccessful candidates in the 1996 New Zealand general election
Unsuccessful candidates in the 1999 New Zealand general election
Unsuccessful candidates in the 2002 New Zealand general election
New Zealand people of Scottish descent